is a city located in Shizuoka Prefecture, Japan. ,  the city had an estimated population of 48,579 in 21,257 households  and a population density of 506 persons per km2.

Geography
Izunokuni is located on the northern "neck" of the Izu Peninsula in eastern Shizuoka Prefecture. The region is hilly, with numerous hot springs. The climate of the region is temperate maritime, with hot, humid summers and short, cool winters, with the warm Kuroshio Current offshore having a moderating effect.

Surrounding municipalities
Atami
Izu
Itō
Numazu
Kannami

Demographics
Per Japanese census data, the population of Izunokuni has been relatively stable over the past 30 years.

Climate
The city has a climate characterized by characterized by hot and humid summers, and relatively mild winters (Köppen climate classification Cfa).  The average annual temperature in Izunokuni is 16.0 °C. The average annual rainfall is 1981 mm with September as the wettest month. The temperatures are highest on average in August, at around 26.5 °C, and lowest in January, at around 6.2 °C.

History
During the late Heian and Kamakura periods, the town of Nirayama within the current borders of Izunokuni was the home of the Later Hōjō clan, who dominated Japanese politics in the 12th century. A castle was established at Nirayama by Ise Moritoki in 1493. During the Edo period, most of Izu Province was tenryō territory under direct control of the Tokugawa shogunate, who ruled Izu and parts of eastern Suruga Province from a daikansho established at Nirayama. After the Meiji Restoration, the area became the short-lived Nirayama Prefecture, which was merged into the equally short-lived Ashigara Prefecture in 1871. From 1876, the area has been part of Shizuoka Prefecture. During the cadastral reform of 1886, the area was reorganized into several villages under Kimisawa District, which was with Tagata District in 1896. In 1934, the village of Izunagaoka was elevated to town status, followed by Ōhito in 1940, and Nirayama in 1962.

The city of Izunokuni was created on April 1, 2005 from the merger of the towns of Izunagaoka, Nirayama and Ōhito (all from Tagata District).

Government
Izunokuni has a mayor-council form of government with a directly elected mayor and a unicameral city legislature of 17 members. The city contributes one member to the Shizuoka Prefectural Assembly.

Economy
The economy of Izunokuni is dominated by agriculture (strawberries and tomatoes) and by tourism related to the hot spring resort industry.

Education
Izunokuni has six public elementary schools and three public junior high schools operated by the city government, and two public high schools operated by the Shizuoka Prefectural Board of Education. The prefecture also operates one special education school for the handicapped.

Transportation

Railway
 Izuhakone Railway - Sunzu Line
   -   -   -   -

Highway

Local attractions

National Historic sites

Nirayama reverberatory furnaces - A group of reverberatory furnaces for manufacturing cannon built in 1857. It was officially registered as a UNESCO World Heritage Site, as one of the constituent Sites of Japan’s Meiji Industrial Revolution: Iron and Steel, Shipbuilding and Coal Mining in 2015.
Ganjōju-in, Buddhist temple with National Treasure sculptures by Unkei
Kitaema Cave Tomb cluster, Jomon period tomb complex
Hōjō residence ruins
Horigoe Gosho ruins
Nirayama Daikansho

Sister City relations
  - Gainesville, Georgia, USA

Notable people from Izunokuni
Sayuri Iwata - actress
Takanobu Hozumi - actor and voice actor

References

External links

 

 
Cities in Shizuoka Prefecture